Summit Christian College is a private Christian college in Gering, Nebraska. It was established in 1951 in Scottsbluff as Platte Valley Bible College. The college is accredited by the Association for Biblical Higher Learning (ABHE) and offers on-campus and distance education programs leading to bachelor's degrees, associate degrees, and certificates. The college is historically affiliated with non-denominational, Christian churches and churches of Christ of the Restoration Movement. Total enrollment varies between about 40 and 60 students.

History
Early in the college's history a program of medical missions was the college's major contribution to the efforts of Christian Church-related Bible colleges in the area of world evangelism. The lack of demand and difficulty to provide for such programs eventually led to the discontinuance of the medical mission program at the college.

In 2005, Platte Valley Bible College changed its name to Summit Christian College.  Three years later, Summit Christian College moved into a newly remodeled campus in the neighboring city of Gering.

Presidents

References

External links
 Official website

Seminaries and theological colleges in Nebraska
Universities and colleges affiliated with the Christian churches and churches of Christ
Unaccredited Christian universities and colleges in the United States
Bible colleges
Educational institutions established in 1951
Education in Scotts Bluff County, Nebraska
Buildings and structures in Scotts Bluff County, Nebraska
1951 establishments in Nebraska